Kjartan Nesbakken Haugen (born March 6, 1975, in Trondheim) is a disabled Norwegian cross-country skier. He won a gold medal at the 2002 Winter Paralympics for 5 km and another gold at the 2006 Winter Paralympics as part of the Norwegian relay team. He also won a bronze in 2002 and a bronze and a silver at the 1998 Games. He is a Right to Play ambassador. Haugen participated at the 2022 Winter Paralympics.

References

External links 
 

1975 births
Living people
Sportspeople from Trondheim
Norwegian male cross-country skiers
Paralympic cross-country skiers of Norway
Paralympic gold medalists for Norway
Paralympic silver medalists for Norway
Paralympic bronze medalists for Norway
Paralympic medalists in cross-country skiing
Cross-country skiers at the 1998 Winter Paralympics
Cross-country skiers at the 2002 Winter Paralympics
Cross-country skiers at the 2006 Winter Paralympics
Cross-country skiers at the 2022 Winter Paralympics
Medalists at the 1998 Winter Paralympics
Medalists at the 2002 Winter Paralympics
Medalists at the 2006 Winter Paralympics
Medalists at the 2022 Winter Paralympics
21st-century Norwegian people